Preethiyalli Sahaja is a 2016 Indian Kannada-language romantic film written and directed by Ratnaja. The film is produced by R. S. Gnaanesh and M. L. Venkatesh under GVK Cinemas banner. The film stars newcomer Surya, Raghu Mukherjee, Avanthika Mohan in the lead roles along with Suhasini Maniratnam and Devaraj in the supporting roles. The music is composed by Raviraj.

Cast

 Surya
 Raghu Mukherjee
 Avantika Mohan
 Devaraj
 Suhasini Maniratnam
 Avinash
 Sharath Lohitashwa
 Ninasam Ashwath
 Sanketh Kashi

Soundtrack

Raviraj, a protege of composer Hamsalekha, has composed the songs and soundtrack for the film. He has also written the lyrics of all the songs except one which is penned by V. Manohar.

Reception 
A critic from The Times of India wrote that " If you are game for 90s like love sagas, which induce unintentional laughs and have many improbable situations, then this one is for you".

References

External links
 
 Official Facebook page

2016 films
2010s Kannada-language films
Indian romance films
2016 romance films